Karvir is a tehsil in Kolhapur district in the Indian state of Maharashtra.

See also
Sangrul

References

Cities and towns in Kolhapur district
Talukas in Maharashtra
Kolhapur district